In mathematics, given two groups, (G, ∗) and (H, ·), a group homomorphism from (G, ∗) to (H, ·) is a function h : G → H such that for all u and v in G it holds that

where the group operation on the left side of the equation is that of G and on the right side that of H.

From this property, one can deduce that h maps the identity element eG of G to the identity element eH of H,

and it also maps inverses to inverses in the sense that 

Hence one can say that h "is compatible with the group structure".

Older notations for the homomorphism h(x) may be xh or xh, though this may be confused as an index or a general subscript.  In automata theory, sometimes homomorphisms are written to the right of their arguments without parentheses, so that h(x) becomes simply .

In areas of mathematics where one considers groups endowed with additional structure, a homomorphism sometimes means a map which respects not only the group structure (as above) but also the extra structure. For example, a homomorphism of topological groups is often required to be continuous.

Intuition 
The purpose of defining a group homomorphism is to create functions that preserve the algebraic structure. An equivalent definition of group homomorphism is: The function h : G → H is a group homomorphism if whenever 

 a ∗ b = c   we have   h(a) ⋅ h(b) = h(c). 

In other words, the group H in some sense has a similar algebraic structure as G and the homomorphism h preserves that.

Types 
Monomorphism A group homomorphism that is injective (or, one-to-one); i.e., preserves distinctness.
Epimorphism A group homomorphism that is surjective (or, onto); i.e., reaches every point in the codomain.
Isomorphism A group homomorphism that is bijective; i.e., injective and surjective. Its inverse is also a group homomorphism. In this case, the groups G and H are called isomorphic; they differ only in the notation of their elements and are identical for all practical purposes.
Endomorphism A group homomorphism, h: G → G; the domain and codomain are the same. Also called an endomorphism of G.
Automorphism A group endomorphism that is bijective, and hence an isomorphism. The set of all automorphisms of a group G, with functional composition as operation, itself forms a group, the automorphism group of G. It is denoted by Aut(G). As an example, the automorphism group of (Z, +) contains only two elements, the identity transformation and multiplication with −1; it is isomorphic to (Z/2Z, +).

Image and kernel 

We define the kernel of h to be the set of elements in G which are mapped to the identity in H
 

and the image  of h to be
 

The kernel and image of a homomorphism can be interpreted as measuring how close it is to being an isomorphism. The first isomorphism theorem states that the image of a group homomorphism, h(G) is isomorphic to the quotient group G/ker h.

The kernel of h is a normal subgroup of G  and the image of h is a subgroup of H:
 

If and only if }, the homomorphism, h, is a group monomorphism; i.e., h is injective (one-to-one). Injection directly gives that there is a unique element in the kernel, and, conversely, a unique element in the kernel gives injection:

Examples 
 Consider the cyclic group Z = (Z/3Z, +) = ({0, 1, 2}, +) and the group of integers (Z, +). The map h : Z → Z/3Z with h(u) = u mod 3 is a group homomorphism. It is surjective and its kernel consists of all integers which are divisible by 3.

 The exponential map yields a group homomorphism from the group of real numbers R with addition to the group of non-zero real numbers R* with multiplication. The kernel is {0} and the image consists of the positive real numbers.
 The exponential map also yields a group homomorphism from the group of complex numbers C with addition to the group of non-zero complex numbers C* with multiplication. This map is surjective and has the kernel {2πki : k ∈ Z}, as can be seen from Euler's formula.  Fields like R and C that have homomorphisms from their additive group to their multiplicative group are thus called exponential fields.

Category of groups 
This shows that the class of all groups, together with group homomorphisms as morphisms, forms a category.

Homomorphisms of abelian groups 
If G and H are abelian (i.e., commutative) groups, then the set  of all group homomorphisms from G to H is itself an abelian group: the sum  of two homomorphisms is defined by
(h + k)(u) = h(u) + k(u)    for all u in G.
The commutativity of H is needed to prove that  is again a group homomorphism.

    and    .
Since the composition is associative, this shows that the set End(G) of all endomorphisms of an abelian group forms a ring, the endomorphism ring of G. For example, the endomorphism ring of the abelian group consisting of the direct sum of m copies of Z/nZ is isomorphic to the ring of m-by-m matrices with entries in Z/nZ. The above compatibility also shows that the category of all abelian groups with group homomorphisms forms a preadditive category; the existence of direct sums and well-behaved kernels makes this category the prototypical example of an abelian category.

See also

Fundamental theorem on homomorphisms
Ring homomorphism
Quasimorphism

References

External links

Group theory
Morphisms